The Anglican Diocese of Etche is one of ten within the Anglican Province of the Niger Delta, itself one of 14 provinces within the Church of Nigeria. The current bishop is Precious Nwala. Nwaha was consecrated a bishop on March 4, 2007 at the Cathedral of the Advent, Abuja; and the missionary diocese was inaugurated on March 19 at St Matthias' Cathedral, Okomoko/Egwi, Etche.

Notes

Church of Nigeria dioceses
Dioceses of the Province of Niger Delta